The Toronto Blue Jays are a Canadian professional baseball team based in Toronto. The Blue Jays compete in Major League Baseball (MLB) as a member club of the American League (AL) East division. Since 1989, the team has played its home games primarily at Rogers Centre in downtown Toronto.

The name "Blue Jays" originates from the bird of the same name, and blue is also the traditional colour of Toronto's collegiate and professional sports teams including the Maple Leafs (ice hockey) and the Argonauts (Canadian football). In 1976, out of the over 4,000 suggestions, 154 people selected the name "Blue Jays." In addition, the team was originally owned by the Labatt Brewing Company, makers of the popular beer Labatt Blue. Colloquially nicknamed the "Jays", the team's official colours are royal blue, navy blue, red, and white. An expansion franchise, the club was founded in Toronto in 1977. Originally based at Exhibition Stadium, the team began playing its home games at SkyDome upon its opening in 1989. Since 2000, the Blue Jays have been owned by Rogers Communications and in 2004, SkyDome was purchased by that company, which renamed it Rogers Centre. Due to border restrictions brought about by the COVID-19 pandemic, the Blue Jays played home games at TD Ballpark in Dunedin, Florida for April and May of the 2021 season, and Sahlen Field in Buffalo, New York for the 2020 season as well as June and July 2021, returning home to Toronto as of July 30 of that year. They are the second MLB franchise to be based outside the United States, and currently the only team based outside the U.S. after the first Canadian franchise, the Montreal Expos, became the Washington Nationals in 2005.

In the late 1970s and early 1980s, the Blue Jays went through struggles typical of an expansion team, frequently finishing last in their division. In 1983, they had their first winning season and two years later, became division champions. From 1985 to 1993, the Blue Jays were an AL East powerhouse, winning five division championships in nine seasons, including three consecutive from 1991 to 1993. During that run, the team also became back-to-back World Series champions in 1992 and 1993, led by a core group of award-winning All-Star players, including Hall of Famer Roberto Alomar, Joe Carter, John Olerud, and Devon White. The Blue Jays became the first (and, to date, only) team outside the U.S. to appear in and win a World Series, and the fastest AL expansion team to do so, winning in its 16th year. As of 2019, they are one of only two MLB franchises that are undefeated through multiple World Series appearances, along with the National League's Miami Marlins. After 1993, the Blue Jays failed to qualify for the playoffs for 21 consecutive seasons, until clinching a playoff berth and division championship in 2015. The team clinched a second consecutive playoff berth in 2016, after securing an AL wild card position. In both years, the Blue Jays beat the Texas Rangers in the AL Division Series, but lost the AL Championship Series. Most recently, they qualified for the playoffs as a wild card team in 2020 and 2022. The Blue Jays and the Atlanta Braves are the only two MLB teams under corporate ownership; the Blue Jays are the only American League team to be under such ownership.

From 1977 to 2022, the Blue Jays' overall win–loss record is 3,598–3,627.

History

Expansion team
The Blue Jays were approved as part of the 1977 Major League Baseball expansion discussions, after Toronto's original plan of getting a Major League Baseball team by buying and moving the San Francisco Giants fell through; they would be added alongside the Seattle Mariners. The team was represented by legal counsel Herb Solway and Gord Kirke. Kirke prepared the original documents which led to the founding of the team in 1976.

1977–1994: The Pat Gillick era

1977–1981

The Blue Jays played their first game on April 7, 1977, against the Chicago White Sox before a home crowd of 44,649. The game is now perhaps best remembered for the minor snowstorm which began just before the game started. Toronto won the snowy affair 9–5, led by Doug Ault's two home runs. That win would be one of only 54 of the 1977 season, as the Blue Jays finished last in the AL East, with a record of 54–107. After the season, assistant general manager Pat Gillick succeeded Peter Bavasi as general manager of the team, a position he would hold until 1994.

In 1978, the team improved their record by five games, but remained last, with a record of 59–102. In 1979, after a 53–109 last place finish, shortstop Alfredo Griffin was named American League co-Rookie of the Year. In addition, the Blue Jays' first mascot, BJ Birdy, made its debut in 1979.

In 1980, Bobby Mattick became manager, succeeding Roy Hartsfield, the Blue Jays' original manager. In Mattick's first season as manager, although the team remained at the bottom, Toronto nearly reached the 70-win mark, finishing with a record of 67–95, a 14-win improvement on 1979. Jim Clancy led with 13 wins and John Mayberry became the first Jay to hit 30 home runs in a season.

In the strike-divided season of 1981, the Blue Jays finished last in the AL East in both halves of the season. They were a dismal 16–42 in the first half but improved dramatically in the second, finishing the 48-game second half at 21–27, for a combined record of 37–69.

1982–1984
Under new manager Bobby Cox, Toronto's first solid season came in 1982 as the Jays finished 78–84. Their pitching staff was led by starters Dave Stieb, Jim Clancy, and Luis Leal, and the outfield featured a young Lloyd Moseby and Jesse Barfield. 1982 was also the first year the Jays did not place last, finishing sixth in the East out of seven teams.

In 1983, the Blue Jays compiled their first winning record, 89–73, finishing in fourth place, nine games behind the eventual World Series champions, the Baltimore Orioles. First baseman Willie Upshaw became the first Blue Jay to get at least 100 RBIs in a season.

The Jays' progress continued in 1984, finishing with the same 89–73 record, but this time in a distant second place behind another World Series champion, the Detroit Tigers. After 1984, Alfredo Griffin went to the Oakland Athletics, thus giving a permanent spot to young Dominican shortstop Tony Fernández, who would become a fan favourite for many years.

1985: The "Drive of '85" and first AL East title

In 1985, Toronto won its first championship of any sort: the first of its six American League East division titles. The Blue Jays featured strong pitching and a balanced offense. Tony Fernández excelled in his first full season, and veteran pitcher Doyle Alexander led the team with 17 wins, including a division-clinching complete-game win. Their mid-season call-up of relief pitcher Tom Henke also proved to be important. The team finished 99–62 (the franchise record for most wins), two games in front of the New York Yankees. The Jays faced the Kansas City Royals in the American League Championship Series (ALCS), and took a three-game-to-one lead. However, Kansas City won three consecutive games to win the series 4–3, on the way to their first World Series championship. The Blue Jays' successful season was dubbed the "Drive of '85".

After the playoffs, Cox, the AL Manager of the Year, suddenly left the Blue Jays to become general manager of the Atlanta Braves, the team he had previously managed.

1986–1988

With Jimy Williams taking over as manager, the Blue Jays could not duplicate their success in 1986, sliding to a fourth-place tie at 86–76. Jesse Barfield and George Bell led the way with 40 and 31 home runs, respectively, while Jim Clancy, Mark Eichhorn, and Jimmy Key tied for the team wins lead with 14 each.

In 1987, the Blue Jays held a -game lead with a week to go in the season, then lost their last seven in a row to finish two games behind the Detroit Tigers, getting swept on the last weekend by the Tigers. The Jays finished with a 96–66 record, second-best in the major leagues, but to no avail. However, George Bell (.308 batting average, 47 home runs, 134 RBI) was named the AL's Most Valuable Player (MVP), the first Blue Jay to earn that honor.

In 1988, however, Toronto could not duplicate the successes of the previous season. The team tied the Milwaukee Brewers for third in the division at 87–75, only two games behind the division champion Boston Red Sox. Still, the season had numerous highlights. First baseman Fred McGriff hit 34 home runs, and Dave Stieb had back-to-back starts in which he lost a no-hitter with two out and two strikes in the ninth inning.

1989–1991: Cito Gaston takes charge, two more AL East titles

In 1989, the Blue Jays' new retractable roofed home, SkyDome, opened mid-season. It also marked the beginning of an extremely successful five-year period for the team. In May, management fired manager Jimy Williams and replaced him with Cito Gaston, the team's hitting instructor. The club had a dismal 12–24 record at the time of the firing, but went 77–49 under Gaston to win the AL East title by two games, with an 89–73 record. Fred McGriff's 36 home runs led the AL. On May 28, George Bell's walk-off home run, off of Chicago White Sox closer Bobby Thigpen, marked the end of the Exhibition Stadium era. The first game at the new stadium took place on June 5 against the Milwaukee Brewers; the Jays lost 5–3. In the 1989 ALCS, Rickey Henderson led the World Series champion Oakland Athletics to a 4–1 series win.

In 1990, the Blue Jays again had a strong season, but finished second, two games behind the Boston Red Sox. Dave Stieb pitched his only no-hitter, beating the Cleveland Indians 3–0 in front of a less-than-capacity crowd at Cleveland Municipal Stadium. As of 2018, it remains the only no-hitter ever pitched by a Blue Jay. During the off-season, the Blue Jays made one of the two biggest trades in franchise history, sending All-Star shortstop Tony Fernández and first baseman Fred McGriff to the San Diego Padres in exchange for outfielder Joe Carter and second baseman Roberto Alomar. The Jays also obtained centre fielder Devon White from the California Angels. These deals, particularly the trade with San Diego, were instrumental in the team's future success.

Carter, Alomar and White would prove to be extremely effective additions, as the Blue Jays again won the division in 1991, as Carter drove in Alomar for the division-winning run. Once again, however, the team fell short in the postseason, losing to the Minnesota Twins, who were on the way to their second World Series victory in five seasons, in the ALCS. In 1991, the Blue Jays became the first Major League club ever to draw over four million fans in one season.

 Team record 1989: 89 wins–73 losses, W%- 0.549
 Team record 1990: 86 wins–76 losses, W%- 0.531, 2 games behind division leader
 Team record 1991: 91 wins–71 losses, W%- 0.562

1992–1993: World Series champions

1992: Canada's first World Series title

After the 1991 season had ended, the Blue Jays acquired pitcher Jack Morris, who had led the Minnesota Twins to victory in the World Series by pitching a 10-inning complete-game shutout in Game 7 and had been named the World Series MVP. To add veteran leadership to their explosive offence, Toronto signed Dave Winfield to be the team's designated hitter.

The 1992 regular season went well, as the Jays clinched their second straight AL East crown with a final record of 96–66, four games ahead of the Milwaukee Brewers. They also went the entire season without being swept in any series, becoming the first team in 49 years to accomplish the feat. The Blue Jays met the Oakland Athletics (who had the same record as the Jays and won the AL West by six games over the defending champion Twins) in the ALCS, winning four games to two. The pivotal game of the series was Game 4, considered by many to be one of the most important games in Blue Jays history: the Blue Jays rallied back from a 6–1 deficit after seven innings, capped off by Roberto Alomar's huge game-tying two-run homer off A's closer Dennis Eckersley in the top of the ninth. This paved the way for a 7–6 victory in 11 innings, a 3-games-to-1 lead in the series and an eventual 4–2 ALCS series win.

The Blue Jays then faced the Atlanta Braves in the World Series. The Braves returned after being beaten by the Twins the previous year. The pivotal game in this series turned out to be Game 2, in which reserve player Ed Sprague hit a 9th-inning two-run home run off Braves closer Jeff Reardon to give the Blue Jays a 5–4 lead, which would hold up. After winning Game 3 thanks to Candy Maldonado's ninth-inning RBI hit and Game 4 due to Jimmy Key's superb -inning pitching effort in which he retired 15 straight batters (five innings), the Jays could not win the Series on home turf as the Braves struck back with a 7–2 win in Game 5. Game 6 in Atlanta, with the Blue Jays leading 3 games to 2, was a very close game. Toronto was one strike away from winning in the bottom of the 9th inning, 2–1, but Otis Nixon singled in the tying run off the Blue Jays' closer Tom Henke. It was the first run the Toronto bullpen had given up in the series. The game was decided in the 11th inning, when Dave Winfield doubled down the left-field line, driving in two runs. The Braves would again come within one run in the bottom of the 11th, but Jays reliever Mike Timlin fielded Otis Nixon's bunt, throwing to Joe Carter at first base for the final out. The Blue Jays became the first team based outside of the United States to win the World Series. Pat Borders, the Jays' catcher, was the unlikely player who was named MVP after hitting .450 with one home run in the World Series. Oddly, Morris was acquired in large part for his reputation as a clutch postseason pitcher, but he went 0–3 in the playoffs. Morris, however, pitched well in the regular season, becoming the Blue Jays' first 20-game winner, with a record of 21–6 and an ERA of 4.04.

 Team record 1992: 96 wins–66 losses, W%- 0.593

1993: Back-to-back champs

After the 1992 season, the Blue Jays let World Series hero Dave Winfield and longtime closer Tom Henke go, but signed two key free agents: designated hitter Paul Molitor from the Milwaukee Brewers and perennial playoff success Dave Stewart from the Oakland Athletics.

In 1993, the Blue Jays had seven All-Stars: outfielders Devon White and Joe Carter, infielders John Olerud and Roberto Alomar, designated hitter Molitor, plus starting pitcher Pat Hentgen, and closer Duane Ward. In August, the Jays acquired former nemesis Rickey Henderson from the Athletics. The Blue Jays cruised to a 95–67 record, seven games ahead of the New York Yankees, winning their third straight division title. The Jays beat the Chicago White Sox four games to two in the ALCS, and then the Philadelphia Phillies, four games to two, for their second straight World Series victory. The World Series featured several exciting games, including Game 4, played under a slight rain, in which the Blue Jays came back from a 14–9 deficit to win 15–14 and take a 3 games to 1 lead in the series. It remains the highest-scoring game in World Series history. Game 6 in Toronto saw the Blue Jays lead 5–1, but give up 5 runs in the 7th inning to trail 6–5. In the bottom of the 9th inning, Joe Carter hit a one-out, three-run walk-off home run to clinch the series off of Phillies closer Mitch Williams. Only the second World Series-winning walk-off home run in the history of Major League Baseball (following Bill Mazeroski's in Game 7 in 1960), Carter's hit differed from the first in that Toronto, while not facing elimination, was trailing in the bottom of the 9th. The home run is also memorable for late Blue Jays radio broadcaster Tom Cheek's call:

Molitor was named the World Series MVP after hitting .500 in the series. In the regular season, three Blue Jays—Olerud, Molitor and Alomar—finished 1–2–3 for the AL batting crown, led by Olerud's franchise record .363 average. It was the first time in 100 years that the top three hitters in the league were from the same team.

 Team record 1993: 95 wins–67 losses, W%- 0.586

1994 season

Expectations were high for the Blue Jays for the 1994 season, following back-to-back championships, but they slumped to a 55–60 record and a third-place finish (16 games back of the New York Yankees) before the players' strike. It was their first losing season since 1982. Joe Carter, Paul Molitor and John Olerud enjoyed good years at the plate, but the pitching fell off. Juan Guzmán slumped considerably from his first three years (40–11, 3.28 ERA), finishing 1994 at 12–11 with a 5.68 ERA. Three young players, Alex Gonzalez, Carlos Delgado and Shawn Green, did show much promise for the future. At the time of the strike, their fellow Canadian cousins, the Montreal Expos, had the best record in the majors, leading some to consider the possibility of a Canadian three-peat in 1994.

On October 31, 1994, Gillick, the longtime Blue Jays general manager, resigned and handed the reins of the team to assistant general manager and Toronto native Gord Ash, who would lead the team in its most tumultuous era yet.

 Team record 1994: 55 wins–60 losses, W%- 0.478, 16 games behind division leader

1995–2001: The Gord Ash era

1995–2000

In their 1995 season, the Blue Jays showed they had lost their contending swagger of the past 12 years. Although they had most of the World Series teams cast, the Jays dropped dramatically to a dismal 56–88 record, placing last in the AL East, 30 games behind the Boston Red Sox. That year, team owner Labatt Breweries was bought by Belgian-based brewer Interbrew, making the Blue Jays the second major league team owned by interests outside of North America, after their expansion cousins, the Seattle Mariners (then owned by Nintendo).

1996 was another mediocre year for the Jays, despite Pat Hentgen's Cy Young Award (20–10, 3.22 ERA). Ed Sprague had a career year, hitting 36 home runs and driving in 101 runs. And the team's 74 wins did put them in fourth place, improving over 1995's last-place finish.

The Blue Jays started their 1997 season with high hopes. Not only did they radically change their uniforms, the team signed former Boston Red Sox ace Roger Clemens to a $24.75 million contract. Clemens had one of the best pitching seasons ever, winning the pitcher's Triple Crown and leading the AL with a record of 21–7, a 2.05 ERA, and 292 strikeouts. This was not enough to lead the Jays to the postseason, however, as they finished last for the second time in three years with a record of 76–86. Cito Gaston, the longtime manager who led the team to four division titles and two World Series crowns, was fired five games before the end of the season. The season did provide a unique experience for its fans with the advent of Interleague play, when the Blue Jays faced their Canadian rival, the Montreal Expos, for the first official games between the two teams. Before the start of their 1998 season, the Jays acquired closer Randy Myers and slugger Jose Canseco. Gaston was replaced with former Blue Jay Tim Johnson, who was a relative unknown as a manager. Despite mediocre hitting, strong pitching led by Clemens' second straight pitching Triple Crown (20–6, 2.65 ERA, 271 strikeouts) sparked the Blue Jays to an 88–74 record—their first winning season since 1993. However, this was only good enough to finish a distant third, 26 games behind the New York Yankees, who posted one of the greatest records in all of baseball history at 114–48. The Jays were, however, in contention for the wildcard spot until the final week.

Before the 1999 season, the Blue Jays traded Clemens to the Yankees for starting pitcher David Wells, second baseman Homer Bush and relief pitcher Graeme Lloyd. They also fired manager Tim Johnson during spring training after he lied about several things (including killing people in the Vietnam War) to motivate his players. The Blue Jays had initially been willing to stand by Johnson. A blizzard of questions about his credibility during spring training, however, led Ash to fire him less than a month before opening day. Johnson was replaced with Jim Fregosi, who managed the Phillies when they lost to the Blue Jays in the 1993 World Series. The offence picked up somewhat in 1999, but the pitching suffered without Clemens, as the Blue Jays finished at 84–78, in third place. After the 1999 season, the Blue Jays' original mascot for 20 years, BJ Birdy, was replaced by a duo named Ace and Diamond.

On November 8, 1999, Toronto traded star outfielder Shawn Green to the Los Angeles Dodgers for left-handed relief pitcher Pedro Borbón and right-fielder Raúl Mondesí. Green had told the Jays that he would not be re-signing when his contract was up at the end of the year (he wished to play closer to his home in Southern California).

The 2000 season proved similar, as the Blue Jays had an 83–79 record, well out of the wild card race but only a slim  games behind the three-time defending World Series champion Yankees in the AL East, the first time since 1993 they had contended for the division. Carlos Delgado had a stellar year, hitting .344 with 41 home runs, 57 doubles, 137 RBI, 123 walks and 115 runs. In addition, six other players hit 20 or more home runs, an outstanding feat.

2000–2001

On September 1, 2000, Rogers Communications Inc. purchased 80% of the baseball club for $160 million, with Interbrew (later InBev) maintaining a 20% interest and the Canadian Imperial Bank of Commerce relinquishing its 10% share. Rogers eventually acquired the 20% owned by Interbrew and now has full ownership of the team.

The 2001 season marked the 25th anniversary of the franchise's inception. Buck Martinez, former catcher and broadcast announcer for the Blue Jays, took over as manager before the season began with a home game in Puerto Rico. The team had a disappointing season, falling back under .500 and finishing 80–82, with mediocre pitching and hitting. Delgado led the team again with 39 home runs and 102 RBI. After the season ended, the Jays fired Gord Ash, ending a seven-year tenure as general manager.

J. P. Ricciardi, then director of player development under Oakland Athletics general manager Billy Beane, was named Blue Jays' General Manager; he was expected to slash payroll immediately, stemming the tide of red ink. During the off-season, the team traded or let go of several popular players, including Alex Gonzalez, Paul Quantrill, Brad Fullmer and closer Billy Koch to let talented youngsters such as Eric Hinske and Felipe López get a chance to develop into major leaguers.

2002–2009: The J. P. Ricciardi and Roy Halladay era

2002 season

The Blue Jays started the 2002 season with slow progress in performance. Buck Martinez was fired about a third of the way through the season, with a 20–33 record. He was replaced by third base coach Carlos Tosca, an experienced minor league manager. They went 58–51 under Tosca to finish the season 78–84. Roy Halladay was relied on as the team's ace and rose to the challenge of being the team's top pitcher, finishing the season with a 19–7 record and 2.93 ERA. The hitters were led once again by Carlos Delgado. Promising young players were assigned to key roles; starting third baseman Eric Hinske won the Rookie of the Year Award at the season's conclusion, and 23-year-old centre fielder Vernon Wells had his first 100 RBI season.

 Team record 2002: 78 wins–84 losses, W%- 0.481, 25.5 games behind division leader, third in division

2003 season

The 2003 season was a surprise to both team management and baseball analysts. After a poor April, the team had its most successful month ever in May. Carlos Delgado led the majors in RBI, followed closely by Wells. Despite their hitting successes, poor pitching continued to plague the team. Halladay was an exception, winning his first Cy Young Award, going 22–7, with a 3.25 ERA. In July, Shannon Stewart was traded to the Minnesota Twins for Bobby Kielty, another outfielder with a much lower batting average than Stewart's. Although the Jays finished in third place in their division, Delgado was second in the voting for the American League MVP Award. In the off-season, Kielty was traded to the Oakland Athletics for starter Ted Lilly.

 Team record 2003: 86 wins–76 losses, W%- 0.531, 15 games behind division leader, third in division

2004 season

The 2004 season was a disappointing year for the Blue Jays right from the beginning. They started the season 0–8 at SkyDome and never started a lengthy winning streak. Much of that was due to injuries to All-Stars Carlos Delgado, Vernon Wells and Roy Halladay among others. Although the additions of starting pitchers Ted Lilly and Miguel Batista and reliever Justin Speier were relatively successful, veteran Pat Hentgen faltered throughout the season and retired on July 24. Rookies and minor league callups David Bush, Jason Frasor, Josh Towers and others filled the void in the rotation and the bullpen; however, inconsistent performances were evident. With the team struggling in last place and mired in a five-game losing streak, manager Carlos Tosca was fired on August 8, 2004, and was replaced by first base coach John Gibbons. Long-time first baseman Carlos Delgado became a free agent in the off-season. Nevertheless, prospects Russ Adams, Gabe Gross, and Alex Ríos provided excitement for the fans. Rookie pitchers David Bush, Gustavo Chacín and Jason Frasor also showed promise for the club's future. The Blue Jays' lone MLB All-Star Game representative was Lilly.

 Team record 2004: 67 wins–94 losses, W%- 0.416, 33.5 games behind division leader, fifth in division

2005 season

SkyDome was renamed Rogers Centre and was extensively renovated. The Blue Jays had a good start to the 2005 season. They led the AL East from early to mid-April and held their record around .500 until late August. The Jays were hit with the injury bug when third baseman Corey Koskie broke his finger, taking him out of the line-up, but the club was pleasantly surprised with the performance of rookie call-up Aaron Hill in his stead. On July 8, just prior to the All-Star break, Blue Jays ace Roy Halladay was struck on the shin by a line drive, resulting in a fractured leg. Though Halladay's injury was hoped to be minor, the recovery process was met with constant delays, and eventually, he was out for the rest of the season. Prior to his injury, the Blue Jays were in serious wild card contention, but soon fell out of the playoff race. The team received glimpses of the future from September call-ups Guillermo Quiróz, John-Ford Griffin, and Shaun Marcum. Marcum made himself noteworthy by posting an ERA of 0.00 over five relief appearances and eight innings in September. Josh Towers also stepped up, showing largely unseen potential by going 7–5 with a 2.91 ERA in the second half of the season.

 Team record 2005: 80 wins–82 losses, W%- 0.494, 15 games behind division leader, third in division

2006 season

In 2006, the team experienced its most successful season in years. On July 2, Troy Glaus, Vernon Wells, Roy Halladay, B. J. Ryan, and Alex Ríos were picked to represent the Blue Jays at the All-Star Game. It was the largest number of Blue Jay All-Stars selected for the game since 1993. The team played well in the critical month of September, going 18–10. This, combined with the slumping of the Boston Red Sox, enabled the Blue Jays to take sole possession of second place in the American League East by the end of the season. This marked the first time that the Jays had finished above third place in their division since their World Championship season of 1993, and with the most wins since the 1998 season. On December 18, the Blue Jays announced that they had re-signed centre fielder Wells to a seven-year contract worth $126 million, which came into effect after the 2007 season.

 Team record 2006: 87 wins–75 losses, W%- 0.537, 10 games behind division leader, second in division

2007 season

The 2007 season was blighted by persistent injuries, with 12 Blue Jays landing on the disabled list. The most serious injury was that of B. J. Ryan, who was out for the entire season having had Tommy John surgery. Prior to the season, the team signed starting pitchers John Thomson, Tomo Ohka, and Víctor Zambrano; each of them was released before the end of the season. However, young starters Shaun Marcum and Dustin McGowan had break-out years, with 12 wins each. On June 24, McGowan pitched a complete game one-hitter. On June 28, Frank Thomas became the 21st major league player to hit 500 career home runs. Aaron Hill also had a break-out year, setting a team record for second baseman with 47 doubles.

 Team record 2007: 83 wins–79 losses, W%- 0.512, 13 games behind division leader, third in division

2008 season

The Blue Jays' 2008 season featured a strong pitching staff, which led the major leagues with a 3.49 ERA. For much of the season, however, the team struggled to hit home runs and drive in runs. On May 24, starter Jesse Litsch set a team record, with 38 consecutive innings without giving up a walk. On June 20, following a five-game losing streak and with the Jays in last place in the AL East, management fired John Gibbons and several members of his coaching staff, and re-hired Cito Gaston. Meanwhile, Alex Ríos had 32 stolen bases, making him the first Blue Jay with 30 since 2001. On September 5, Roy Halladay earned his 129th career win, moving him into second spot on Toronto's all-time wins list. Halladay also came second in the voting for the Cy Young Award, after posting a 20–11 record and 2.78 ERA.

 Team record 2008: 86 wins–76 losses, W%- 0.531, 11 games behind division leader, fourth in division

2009 season

The 2009 season saw the addition of two new patches on the Blue Jays' uniforms: on the right arm, a bright red maple leaf (part of the Canadian flag), and on the left arm, a small black band with "TED" written on it, in reference to the late team owner Ted Rogers, who died in the off-season.

On Opening Day at the Rogers Centre, the Blue Jays, led by Roy Halladay, beat the Detroit Tigers 12–5. Aaron Hill and Roy Halladay both had excellent years and represented the Blue Jays at the 2009 All-Star Game in St. Louis. The Jays started the season well, posting a 27–14 record; however, immediately afterwards, the Jays fell into a nine-game losing streak and was never able to recover for the remainder of the season. In mid-August, GM J. P. Ricciardi allowed the Chicago White Sox to claim Alex Ríos off waivers. With two games remaining in what was a disappointing season, Ricciardi was fired on October 3. He was replaced by assistant general manager Alex Anthopoulos.

Despite a 75-win season, the Jays saw the strong return of Aaron Hill, who won the American League Comeback Player of the Year Award and the Silver Slugger for second base. Adam Lind, who also had a strong season, earned the Silver Slugger for designated hitter.

 Team record 2009: 75 wins–87 losses, W%- 0.463, 28 games behind division leader, fourth in division

2010–2015: The Alex Anthopoulos and José Bautista era

2010 season

In the off-season, the Jays' ace Roy Halladay was traded to the Philadelphia Phillies for Kyle Drabek, Travis d'Arnaud, and Michael Taylor; Taylor was immediately traded to the Oakland Athletics for Brett Wallace. The team's significant free agent signings were that of catcher John Buck and shortstop Álex González.

The 2010 season was a surprising 10-win improvement over the last season. It was a career year for José Bautista, who hit 54 home runs, breaking George Bell's franchise record of 47. In doing so, he became the 26th player to reach 50 home runs and the first since Alex Rodriguez and Prince Fielder achieved the feat in 2007. The Blue Jays also set a franchise record for the most home runs in a single season as they hit 257, 13 more than their previous record of 244 set by the 2000 Blue Jays. The Blue Jays tied the 1996 Baltimore Orioles for the third-most home runs by a team in a single season. Seven players (José Bautista, Vernon Wells, Aaron Hill, Adam Lind, Lyle Overbay, John Buck, and Edwin Encarnación) hit 20 home runs or more throughout the season, tying an MLB record previously set by four teams, including the 2000 Blue Jays.

On July 14, the Jays traded Álex González and two minor league prospects—left-handed pitcher Tim Collins and shortstop Tyler Pastornicky—to the Atlanta Braves for Jo-Jo Reyes and Yunel Escobar.

On August 7, catching prospect J. P. Arencibia made his major league debut. He went 4-for-5 with two home runs, including a home run hit on the first pitch he saw. The next day, starting pitcher Brandon Morrow came within one out of a no-hitter, finishing with 17 strikeouts in a complete-game one-hitter.

 Team record 2010: 85 wins–77 losses, W%- 0.525, 11 games behind division leader, fourth in division

2011 season

Led by new manager John Farrell, the 2011 Blue Jays finished with a .500 record. After signing a five-year $64 million contract extension, José Bautista followed up his record-setting 2010 season with an arguably better season. He finished with a Major League-leading 43 home runs, along with 103 RBI, 132 walks, and a .302 average. Rookie J. P. Arencibia also had a successful year, setting a Blue Jays single-season record with 23 home runs by a catcher. In August, third base prospect Brett Lawrie made his Major League debut and hit .293 with 9 home runs, 4 triples, and 25 RBI, in just 43 games.

Starting pitcher and ace Ricky Romero led the team with 15 wins and a 2.92 ERA. He also became an All-Star for the first time in his career. The other starting pitchers were inconsistent, and Farrell used 12 different starters over the course of the season. Jon Rauch and Frank Francisco, both acquired in the off-season, shared the closer role. They both struggled through the first half of the season, though Francisco improved in the last two months of the season, and had six saves in September.

On July 31, the Blue Jays retired their first number, Roberto Alomar's #12, one week after Alomar became the first Hall of Famer to be inducted as a Blue Jay.

 Team record 2011: 81 wins–81 losses, W%- 0.500, 16 games behind division leader, fourth in division

2012 season

The 2012 season was an injury-plagued year for the Blue Jays, having used 31 total pitchers, which set a franchise record. In June, three starting pitchers (Brandon Morrow, Kyle Drabek, and Drew Hutchison) were lost to injury in a span of four days, two of whom required Tommy John surgery; in addition, starters Dustin McGowan and Jesse Litsch missed the entire season due to injury. In the second half of the season, some key players in Toronto's line-up, including All-Star José Bautista, missed a significant amount of playing time due to injury, sending the team into a freefall and culminating in a 73–89 record. Despite the underachievements of Ricky Romero and Adam Lind, Casey Janssen established himself as a reliable closer (22 SV, 2.52 ERA) and Edwin Encarnación developed into one of the league's best power hitters (.280 average, 42 home runs, 110 RBI).

On April 5, 2012, the team opened on the road in Cleveland, where they beat the Indians 7–4 in 16 full innings, during this game they set the record of the longest opening-day game in the Major League history. The previous record of 15 innings had been set by the Washington Senators and Philadelphia Athletics on April 13, 1926, and tied by the Detroit Tigers and the Indians on April 19, 1960.

On April 20, the Jays turned a triple play against the Kansas City Royals in a 4–3 win. It was the first triple play they turned since September 21, 1979.

 Team record 2012: 73 wins–89 losses, W%- 0.451, 22 games behind division leader, fourth in division

2013 season

During the off-season, the Toronto Blue Jays traded Farrell to the Boston Red Sox per his wishes, and former manager John Gibbons returned to manage the Blue Jays. The Jays also made a blockbuster trade with the Miami Marlins, leading to a series of other blockbuster trades and signings, including with the New York Mets for National League Cy Young winner R. A. Dickey and free agents including Melky Cabrera. On June 8, the Blue Jays played the then-longest game in franchise history by innings, winning 4–3 in 18 innings against the visiting Texas Rangers, which would be broken one season later. The Jays matched their franchise record of 11 consecutive wins in a 13–5 home win over the Baltimore Orioles on June 23. However, the Jays had a losing season overall.
 Team record 2013: 74 wins–88 losses, W%- 0.457, 23 games behind division leader, fifth in division, 17.5 games behind AL wild card cutoff, eighth in AL wild card

2014 season

Pitcher Roy Halladay signed a one-day contract with the Blue Jays before retiring from baseball, citing injuries. The Jays had a nine-game win streak from May 20 to 28, as well as wins in 18 of 21 between May 15 and June 6.
On August 10, the Blue Jays played the longest game in franchise history by both time and innings, winning 6–5 in 19 innings and playing 6 hours, 37 minutes against the visiting Detroit Tigers.

 Team record 2014: 83 wins–79 losses, W%- , 13 games behind division leader, third in division, 5 games behind AL wild card cutoff, sixth in AL wild card

2015: Return to the playoffs, AL East champions

During the off-season, the Jays signed Toronto-born catcher Russell Martin through free agency. The Jays acquired Marco Estrada, Devon Travis, All-Star third baseman Josh Donaldson, and Michael Saunders in trades. The Jays claimed Justin Smoak, Andy Dirks, and Chris Colabello off waivers. However, Dirks, along with John Mayberry Jr., were eventually non–tendered; the Jays later signed Dirks to a minor league contract. Melky Cabrera and Brandon Morrow left through free agency and Juan Francisco was claimed off waivers by the Boston Red Sox.

The Jays later traded José Reyes and pitching prospects Miguel Castro, Jeff Hoffman, and Jesus Tinoco to the Colorado Rockies for All-Star shortstop Troy Tulowitzki and reliever LaTroy Hawkins. Two days later, they acquired All-Star pitcher David Price from the Detroit Tigers in exchange for pitching prospects Daniel Norris, Matt Boyd, and Jairo Labourt.

The Jays had two 11-game winning streaks during this season. On September 25, the Blue Jays clinched a playoff berth, ending the longest active playoff drought in North American professional sports (see List of Major League Baseball franchise postseason droughts). They subsequently claimed the AL East division title on September 30, after defeating the Baltimore Orioles 15–2 in the first game of a doubleheader.

The Blue Jays faced the Texas Rangers in the ALDS. After losing back-to-back home games, they won the next three games in a row to take the five-game series, advancing to the ALCS; a three-game comeback series victory had not been accomplished since 2012 by the San Francisco Giants. During game five of the series in Toronto, Blue Jays' right fielder José Bautista executed what Andrew Keh of The New York Times described as possibly "the most ostentatious bat flip in MLB history" after hitting a go-ahead, three-run home run off Rangers relief pitcher Sam Dyson. Bautista wrote an article about the bat flip published in November 2015 in The Players' Tribune.

The Blue Jays then faced the Kansas City Royals in the ALCS, losing the series 4–2 in Kansas City; the Royals would eventually win the World Series.

After the playoffs, Donaldson was named AL MVP, becoming the first Blue Jay to win the award since George Bell in 1987.

 Team record 2015: 93 wins–69 losses, W%-

2016–present: The Ross Atkins era

2016: Wild Card winners

Upon the expiration of Paul Beeston's contract, Mark Shapiro replaced him as president of the Blue Jays. Alex Anthopoulos resigned two months after the hiring of Shapiro. Ross Atkins subsequently took his place.

During the off-season, David Price left the Blue Jays through free agency, signing with the Boston Red Sox, while the Blue Jays signed J. A. Happ. On March 4, 2016, infielder Maicer Izturis announced his retirement from baseball. A few weeks later, Brad Penny and Rafael Soriano, both veterans under minor league contract with the Blue Jays, retired from baseball as well.

On May 15, 2016, the Blue Jays and the Texas Rangers brawled against each other in Arlington, Texas. The brawl happened when Matt Bush threw a pitch at Jose Bautista, then Bautista made an illegal slide, and Rougned Odor punched Bautista. Bautista was later suspended for one game.

On May 31, 2016, the Blue Jays traded for Jason Grilli from the Atlanta Braves. Before the non-waiver trade deadline at 4 pm EDT on August 1, 2016, the Blue Jays traded for Joaquín Benoit, Melvin Upton Jr., Scott Feldman, and Francisco Liriano. On August 25, 2016, the Blue Jays re-acquired popular backup catcher Dioner Navarro in a trade with the Chicago White Sox. This was done before the August 31 trade deadline making Navarro eligible to be on the postseason roster.

On October 2, 2016, the Blue Jays clinched their first Wild Card berth with a Detroit Tigers loss to the Atlanta Braves. On October 4, 2016, the Blue Jays defeated the Baltimore Orioles in the American League Wild Card Game in extra innings, via a walk-off three-run home run by Edwin Encarnación in the bottom of the 11th inning. On October 9, 2016, the Blue Jays completed a sweep of the Texas Rangers in the American League Division Series to advance to the American League Championship Series for the second consecutive year. On October 19, 2016, the Blue Jays were eliminated from World Series contention with a 3–0 loss to the Cleveland Indians in Game 5 of the American League Championship Series.

 Team record 2016: 89 wins–73 losses, W%-

2017 season

On November 11, 2016, it was announced that Toronto had signed designated hitter Kendrys Morales to a three-year, $33 million deal. The contract became official on November 18. 

On December 5, 2016, Steve Pearce signed a two-year, $12.5 million contract with Toronto. On January 5, 2017, Edwin Encarnación signed a three-year, $60 million contract with the Cleveland Indians. On January 18, 2017, Bautista signed a one-year, $18 million contract with the Blue Jays. The contract includes a $17 million mutual option for the 2018 season, as well as a $20 million vesting option for 2019. The following day, Michael Saunders signed with the Philadelphia Phillies. However, in late June, the Phillies released Saunders and the Jays signed him to a minor league contract.

On April 2, one day before the start of the regular season, Melvin Upton Jr. was released. By the end of April, the Jays had the worst record in all of MLB.

On July 2, the Jays traded Grilli to the Texas Rangers for Eduard Pinto. Pearce hit two walk-off grand slams in a span of three days: one against the Oakland Athletics on July 27 and another against the Los Angeles Angels on July 30, the latter of which is an ultimate grand slam.

The Blue Jays wore special red-and-white uniforms at select games during the 2017 season to celebrate the 150th anniversary of Canada.

 Team record 2017: 76 wins–86 losses, W%- , 17 games behind division leader, fourth in division, 9 games behind AL wild card cutoff, eighth in AL wild card

2018 season

The Blue Jays declined their mutual option on José Bautista, allowing him to enter free agency. He then signed with the Atlanta Braves, later the New York Mets, and eventually with the Philadelphia Phillies.

The Blue Jays traded two prospects to the San Diego Padres for Yangervis Solarte. The Blue Jays also acquired Curtis Granderson and Seung-hwan Oh as free agents.

On June 22, Roberto Osuna was suspended for 75 games after being accused of sexual assault on May 8 and applied retroactively from the date of the incident.

In July, the Blue Jays traded Pearce to the Boston Red Sox for a prospect, Santiago Espinal. They also dealt three pitchers: J. A. Happ to the New York Yankees, Seung-hwan Oh to the Colorado Rockies, and Roberto Osuna to the Houston Astros.

In August, the Blue Jays traded Josh Donaldson to the Cleveland Indians for a player to be named later, later revealed to be a pitching prospect, Julian Merryweather. The Blue Jays also traded Curtis Granderson to the Milwaukee Brewers for a prospect.

On September 26, it was confirmed by the Blue Jays that manager John Gibbons would not return for the 2019 season.

 Team record 2018: 73 wins–89 losses, W%- , 35 games behind division leader, fourth in division, 24 games behind AL wild card cutoff, seventh in AL wild card

2019 season

On October 25, 2018, the Blue Jays announced that Charlie Montoyo had been hired as their new manager.

Early in the season, the Blue Jays traded Kendrys Morales to the Oakland Athletics and Kevin Pillar to the San Francisco Giants.

During the season, the Blue Jays called up Vladimir Guerrero Jr., Cavan Biggio, and Bo Bichette for the first time. The three are second-generation Major League Baseball players with the first two also being sons of Hall of Famers Vladimir Guerrero Sr. and Craig Biggio, respectively; Bo Bichette is the son of Dante Bichette.

Nearing the trade deadline, the Blue Jays traded Marcus Stroman to the New York Mets and Aaron Sanchez to the Houston Astros.

 Team record 2019: 67 wins–95 losses, W%- , 36 games behind division leader, fourth in division, 29 games behind AL wild card cutoff, ninth in AL wild card

2020 season: Temporarily in Buffalo

Over the 2019–20 off-season, the Blue Jays signed free agents Tanner Roark and Hyun-jin Ryu. The Blue Jays also signed Shun Yamaguchi from the Yomiuri Giants, the first player the Blue Jays successfully signed via the posting system.

On January 18, 2020, the Toronto Blue Jays unveiled a new blue alternate uniform.

On July 24, 2020, it was announced that the Toronto Blue Jays would play a majority of their home games in Buffalo, New York, at their Triple-A affiliate Buffalo Bisons ballpark, Sahlen Field, as the Canadian government disallowed the Blue Jays and their opponents from playing in Canada during the COVID-19 pandemic.

The Blue Jays reached the Wild Card series of the postseason, only to be swept by the Tampa Bay Rays in two games. The Blue Jays scored only three runs total in the two games.

 Team record 2020: 32 wins–28 losses, W%-

2021 season: Temporarily in Dunedin and Buffalo

On successive days in January 2021, the Blue Jays signed relief pitchers Kirby Yates and Tyler Chatwood, and outfielder George Springer. The Blue Jays also signed infielder Marcus Semien. However, Yates was out for the entire season to recover from Tommy John surgery.

The Toronto Blue Jays played their home games in TD Ballpark in Dunedin, Florida until June 1 when they moved back to Sahlen Field in Buffalo. On July 16, the Blue Jays announced that they would finally return to Rogers Centre in Toronto on July 30 after the Canadian government allowed the Blue Jays and their opponents to play in Canada.

Alek Manoah was called up to the majors for the first time this season.

Despite having 91 wins in 2021, the Toronto Blue Jays were fourth in the American League East and one game back of the Wild Card cutoff, preventing them from reaching the postseason.

 Team record 2021: 91 wins–71 losses, W%- , 9 games behind division leader, fourth in division, 1 game behind AL wild card cutoff, third in AL wild card.

2022 season

During the off-season, the Blue Jays signed Kevin Gausman, Yimi Garcia, and Yusei Kikuchi as Robbie Ray, Marcus Semien, and Kirby Yates left for free agency. The off-season is mainly affected by a lockout that lasted from December 2021 to March 2022. After the lockout, the Blue Jays traded for Matt Chapman from the Oakland Athletics, as well as traded Randal Grichuk for Raimel Tapia. On July 13, the team released Charlie Montoyo as the manager for the team. With his four seasons with Toronto (2019–2022), he had a win-loss record of 236–235 (.501), and made it to the playoffs once (2020 ALWC). The new interim manager is bench coach John Schneider. At the trade deadline, the Blue Jays traded for Whit Merrifield from the Kansas City Royals. After the trade deadline, the Blue Jays claimed Jackie Bradley Jr. from waivers.

The Blue Jays clinched home advantage for the American League Wild Card Series and hosted the Seattle Mariners. However, the Mariners swept the Blue Jays in two games, overcoming an 8-1 deficit in game 2.

 Team record 2022: 92 wins–70 losses, W%-

2023 season

During the off-season, the Blue Jays traded Teoscar Hernández to the Seattle Mariners for Erik Swanson and Adam Macko. The Blue Jays hired Don Mattingly as the new bench coach. The Blue Jays later signed Chris Bassitt and Kevin Kiermaier and traded Gabriel Moreno and Lourdes Gurriel Jr. to the Arizona Diamondbacks for Daulton Varsho.

Popularity

In 1977, after just 50 home games, the Blue Jays set an MLB record for a first-year expansion team, with an overall attendance of 1,219,551 during those games. By the end of the season, 1,701,152 fans had attended. After setting an attendance record in 1990, with 3,885,284 fans, in 1991, the Blue Jays became the first MLB team to attract over four million fans, with an attendance of 4,001,526, followed by 4,028,318 in 1992. Each of those records were broken in 1993 by the expansion Colorado Rockies, although the Blue Jays' 1993 attendance of 4,057,947 stood as an AL record for 12 years until it was broken by the 2005 New York Yankees.

Several Blue Jays became very popular in Toronto and across the major leagues, starting with Dave Stieb, whose seven All-Star selections is a franchise record. He is closely followed by Roy Halladay and José Bautista, who were selected six times each, and by Roberto Alomar and Joe Carter, who were selected five times each. Bautista set a major league record in 2011 (which only stood for just one year), with 7,454,753 All-Star votes. In his first season with the Blue Jays in 2015, Josh Donaldson set a new major league record by receiving 14,090,188 All-Star votes.

Culture

"OK Blue Jays"

During the seventh-inning stretch of home games, before singing "Take Me Out to the Ball Game", Blue Jay fans sing and clap to "OK Blue Jays" by Keith Hampshire and The Bat Boys, which was released in 1983. The song was remixed in 2003, and since then, the new, shortened version is played at home games.

Mascots

From 1979 to 1999, BJ Birdy served as the Blue Jays' sole mascot, played by Kevin Shanahan. In 2000, he was replaced by a duo named Ace and Diamond. After the 2003 season, Diamond was removed by the team, leaving Ace as the team's sole mascot. Since the 2010s, Ace has been accompanied by his younger brother, Junior. This usually happens on the Jr. Jay Saturday promotions until the end of the 2017 season. The promotions were moved to select Sundays since the 2018 season, since the Blue Jays can no longer hold early Saturday afternoon games to accommodate American national broadcasts on Fox, though Fox did occasionally broadcast Blue Jays games at the Rogers Centre.

Sunday Salute
Since 2012, every Sunday home game, the Blue Jays pay tribute to a member of the Canadian Armed Forces. During the third inning, the team presents the honoured member a personalized jersey.

National anthems
Since 2005, "The Star-Spangled Banner" has been sung before "O Canada" at every home game. In some home games (including Canada Day home games and playoffs), "O Canada" is sung in English and French. When O Canada was sung during the Home Opener, Canada Day, and playoff games, a giant Canadian flag was carried by members of the Canadian Armed Forces. On June 29, 2019, "O Canada" was sung in Cree and English. On September 30, 2021, the National Day for Truth and Reconciliation, "O Canada" was sung in English, French, and Anishinaabemowin. On September 30, 2022, O Canada was sung in French, English, and Blackfoot. For Blue Jays road games, "O Canada" is sung before the "Star Spangled Banner" as all road games (since the Expos moved to Washington, DC) for the Blue Jays are in the United States.

Canada Day
The Blue Jays traditionally host a home game during Canada Day. During the game, the team wears red jerseys instead of blue jerseys. During the pre-game ceremony, a giant Canadian flag is carried by members of the Canadian Armed Forces while O Canada is sung in English and French. The game was cancelled in 2020 due to the COVID-19 pandemic. In 2021, the game was held in Buffalo, New York due to Canada–U.S. travel restrictions.

Jays Shop

The Blue Jays operate a store that sells primarily Blue Jays merchandise called the Jays Shop. This store has three locations: two at Rogers Centre and one in the Toronto Eaton Centre.

Uniforms

1977–1988
The Blue Jays wore pullover uniforms during their first decade of existence. The front of the home white uniforms contained the team name in a unique blue/white/blue split-letter style, with the team logo centred below. The road uniforms were powder blue, with the city name in front and the team logo centred below. Initially, the city name was rendered in bold blue letters, before gaining a white outline the following season. By 1979 it was replaced by the team name in split-lettered white/blue/white style. Player numerals also used the split-letter style, except on the road uniform during its first two seasons. Player names in blue were added to both uniforms for the 1980 season, but were dropped from the road uniform in 1981. Caps were blue with the Blue Jays logo on a white panel in front.

1989–1996
The Blue Jays adopted buttoned uniforms upon moving to Rogers Centre (then SkyDome) in 1989. Aside from the additions of buttons and belts, the only change affecting the home uniforms was the relocation of the team logo to the left chest. The road uniforms changed from powder blue to grey, while the city name and numerals in blue/white/blue split-letters was emblazoned and the logo moved to the left chest. Player names were also added to the road uniform. All-blue caps were worn with their road uniform while keeping the white-paneled blue caps at home. By 1993, the all-blue caps were worn universally, supplanting and eventually retiring the original cap design.

In 1994 the Blue Jays began wearing blue alternate uniforms with the team name and numerals in white/blue/white split letters.

1997–2003
The Blue Jays updated their logo prior to the 1997 season, with a new bird design and enlarged red maple leaf at the back. The usage of red was greatly increased on the team's new uniforms. On the home uniforms, the letters and numerals were changed to blue/teal/blue split letters, while road uniform letters and numerals were changed to blue/red/blue split letters. On the alternate blue uniforms, split letters and numerals became red/blue/red. Red also appeared on the pant and sleeve stripes while the new logo occupied the left sleeve. Player names also took on the new block split-letter style. An updated all-blue cap was paired with the home and road uniforms, while a red-brimmed blue cap (with a modified logo without a baseball) was used with the blue alternates.

In 1999 the Blue Jays unveiled an alternate sleeveless white uniform, featuring the same lettering style as the regular home uniform. However, the chest numerals were replaced with the primary logo. Blue undershirts were worn with this uniform.

Before the 2001 season slight modifications were made with the uniforms, eliminating the tricolour stripes and adding a single colour piping along the chest and neck. While the home uniforms remained mostly intact, the road uniforms gained blue sleeves in a faux-vest design. On the alternate white uniform (now a faux-vest instead of a straight sleeveless design), the new "T-bird" logo replaced the primary "jay leaf" logo, which moved to the left sleeve. In 2003, the "T-bird" logo became the primary, taking over the previous logo's placement on the caps and sleeve, while the alternate white uniforms brought back chest numerals.

2004–2011
Before the 2004 season, the Blue Jays adopted a new visual identity, going with a black, silver and graphite motif. The home and black alternates simply read "Jays" in front and in a 3D-oriented diagonal arrangement, with the bird connected to the letter "J". Letters and numerals were in graphite with light blue and silver trim. The road uniforms featured the city name in a similar letter style as the logo, with graphite letters and numerals trimmed in light blue and silver. In 2008, however, amid complaints of illegibility, the Blue Jays tweaked their road uniforms to include 3D-style block letters and numerals in light blue trimmed in black and white, along with chest numerals. The "J-bird" alternate was added to the left sleeve. A red maple leaf would be added on the right sleeve starting in 2009. The Blue Jays wore all-black caps with the "J-bird" logo for much of the uniforms' existence, save for the 2004 and 2005 seasons when they wore all-graphite caps at home, and in 2007 when an alternate all-black cap with the "T" from the previous road uniform was used.

2012–present
Prior to the 2012 season, the Blue Jays unveiled new uniforms and a new logo. The logo is a modernized version of the original logo used from 1977 to 1996. While the original logo contained a baseball behind the Blue Jay head, the new logo removed the baseball altogether. The bird's head was also made sleeker than its 1977-1996 predecessor. The uniforms are similar to the ones used from 1989 to 1996, the team's most successful era. New serifed split-letters were also released. In 2015, the Blue Jays began wearing a modernized version of the white-paneled blue caps they originally wore from 1977 to 1993 as an alternate.

Before the 2020 season, the Blue Jays unveiled a modernized version of the powder blue uniforms, featuring navy/white/navy serifed split letters and numerals. These uniforms are paired with a powder-brimmed navy cap and an all-navy helmet.

Canada Day uniforms
Since 1996, the Blue Jays wore predominantly red or red-accented uniforms every July 1, Canada Day. The uniforms were based on the team's alternate uniforms they wore at the time, but with red as the primary colour. On a few occasions, the Blue Jays added red trim to an existing white uniform (or in the case of the 2006 uniforms, their black alternates), and sometimes add the flag of Canada or a red maple leaf on the uniform.

Rivalries

Montreal Expos

The Montreal Expos were the Blue Jays' geographic National League rival, being the other Canadian MLB team before it was relocated. From 1978 to 1986, the teams played an annual mid-season exhibition game, known as the Pearson Cup, named after former Prime Minister Lester B. Pearson. The teams began facing each other in the regular season in 1997, with the advent of interleague play. During the 2003 and 2004 seasons, the Expos' last two seasons before relocating to Washington, D.C., as the Nationals, the Pearson Cup was awarded after a pair of three-game sets.

Detroit Tigers
The Detroit Tigers are the Blue Jays' geographic and traditional rival, dating back to the 1980s, when the teams were AL East contenders. The Tigers moved to the AL Central in 1998, and the rivalry has died down as a result, with the teams facing each other only six to seven times per year since 2011. Depending on traffic and border delays, Detroit is about a four-hour drive from Toronto. According to The Detroit News, a July 2017 three-game series at Comerica Park against the Blue Jays drew a season-best-to-date total attendance of 115,088.

Seattle Mariners
Although the Seattle Mariners are not a divisional rival, many Blue Jays fans from Western Canada travel to Seattle when the Blue Jays play there as Seattle is geographically closer to Western Canada than Toronto is. Depending on traffic and border delays, Seattle is about a three-hour drive from Vancouver. The Seattle Times estimated that Blue Jays fans represented around 70 percent of the crowd in Safeco Field for a June 2017 weekend series.

Broadcasting

Radio
The Blue Jays' former radio play-by-play announcer, Tom Cheek, called every Toronto Blue Jays game from the team's inaugural contest on April 7, 1977, until June 3, 2004, when he took two games off following the death of his father—a streak of 4,306 consecutive regular-season games and 41 postseason games. Cheek later died on October 9, 2005, and the team commemorated him during their 2006 season by wearing a circular patch on the left sleeve of their home and road game jerseys. The patch was adorned with the letters 'TC', Cheek's initials, as well as a stylized microphone. Cheek is also honoured with a place in the Blue Jays' "Level of Excellence" in the upper level of the Rogers Centre; the number 4,306 is depicted beside his name. In 2008, Cheek received the third most votes by fans to be nominated for the Ford C. Frick Award for broadcasting excellence. Cheek finally received the Frick Award, posthumously, in 2013 after nine years on the ballot.

Radio broadcasts of Blue Jays games are originated from Sportsnet 590 CJCL in Toronto which, like the Blue Jays, is owned by Rogers Communications. After Cheek's retirement in 2005, Jerry Howarth, who had been Cheek's broadcasting partner since 1982, took over as lead play-by-play announcer, with Mike Wilner as the secondary play-by-play announcer. During the 2007 to 2012 seasons, former Blue Jays catcher Alan Ashby was the colour commentator. Former Blue Jays pitcher Jack Morris served as the colour commentator during the 2013 season, after which he was replaced by former Montreal Expos catcher Joe Siddall since the 2014 season.

Former Blue Jays pitcher Dirk Hayhurst filled in for Morris for some games during the 2013 season.

Another former catcher for the Blue Jays, Gregg Zaun, has served as the occasional colour commentator from the 2011 season until the end of the 2017 season when he was terminated amid accusations of improper conduct from several female employees.

Following Howarth's retirement in the 2017 season, Ben Wagner was hired as the primary radio play-by-play announcer, splitting said duties with Dan Shulman and Mike Wilner.

In November 2020, Mike Wilner was laid off by the team. In February 2021, it was announced that "in an effort to minimize travel and closely adhere to team, league, and government protocols related to the pandemic", all radio broadcasts for the 2021 season will be a simulcast of the television broadcast. Wagner will assume an alternative role. However, once the Blue Jays returned to Rogers Centre in late July 2021, dedicated radio broadcasts resumed.

The Blue Jays have the largest geographical home market in all of baseball, encompassing all of Canada. Despite this, the number of radio stations that broadcast games is actually quite small. Only 18 radio stations across the country aired at least some Blue Jays games during the 2021 season, which is fewer affiliates than most MLB teams, which have more stations covering smaller geographic areas.

Television
All Blue Jays games are carried nationally on Sportsnet (which, like the Blue Jays, is owned by Rogers Communications), with Buck Martinez as the play-by-play announcer, and Pat Tabler as the primary colour analyst. On select games, play-by-play is handled by Dan Shulman, with Martinez and Tabler on commentary. Toronto Raptors play-by-play announcer Matt Devlin has also filled in for Martinez in a select number of games. In previous years, the colour analyst role rotated between Pat Tabler, Rance Mulliniks, Darrin Fletcher, and from 2011 to 2017, Gregg Zaun. Sportsnet became the team's primary carrier soon after it launched in the late 1990s, and became the team's exclusive broadcaster in 2010. As of August 2010, Sportsnet One also broadcasts Blue Jays games (often in case of scheduling conflicts with the main Sportsnet channels). Rogers was, however, criticized by fans and critics due to Sportsnet One only being carried by Rogers Cable systems on launch.

Sportsnet's broadcasts of the 2015 American League Division Series involving the Blue Jays were among the highest-rated telecasts in network history, with Game 4 drawing an audience of 4.38 million viewers.

In September 2012, AMI-tv simulcast three Blue Jays games with described video provided by CJCL correspondent Sam Cosentino, which included explanations of on-screen graphics. Paul Beeston praised AMI's involvement, stating that "to our knowledge, we are the first sports organization to have our games provided through this revolutionary approach to accommodating the needs of the blind and low-vision community."

On June 27, 2013, Rogers' over-the-air Toronto multicultural Omni Television station CJMT-DT simulcast a Blue Jays game, scheduled to be started by Taiwanese player Chien-Ming Wang, with commentary in Mandarin, marking the first ever Canadian MLB broadcast in the language. In June 2018, Omni announced that it would air Sunday afternoon games in Tagalog, the most spoken language of the Philippines, through the remainder of the season. Sportsnet and Omni announced a regular season of Sunday broadcasts in Tagalog for the 2019 season.

TVA Sports has aired games in French since 2011, with Denis Casavant and François Paquet on play-by-play and Rodger Brulotte on colour. The channel currently has rights to 81 Blue Jay games per season, in a three-year deal signed in 2023. Jacques Doucet, former Montreal Expos radio announcer, broadcast the Blue Jays on TVA Sports from 2011 until his retirement in 2022.

The Sports Network (TSN), which (like the Jays) was owned by Labatt from 1984 to 1995, served as the primary cable television outlet for the Blue Jays prior to the launch of Sportsnet. TSN (and later, its sister channel TSN2) continued to carry approximately ten Jays games through the 2009 season until May 2010; most recently, Rod Black handled play-by-play while Tabler served as colour commentator on these telecasts. CBC has carried Blue Jays games intermittently throughout the team's history, most recently in 2007 and 2008; those broadcasts featured Jim Hughson as the play-by-play announcer, and former Blue Jays Rance Mulliniks and Jesse Barfield on colour commentary. Games also aired on CTV (except in Montreal) from the team's inception until the late 1990s. The Blue Jays have not appeared over-the-air in Canada in English since 2008.

In 2008, Rogers Communications, owner of the Jays, was granted a license by the Canadian Radio-Television Commission (CRTC) for a "Baseball TV" specialty channel. The channel would have been dedicated to coverage of baseball, combining content from the United States-based MLB Network with original Canadian content. However, the channel was never launched, and Rogers sponsored an application to allow distribution of the U.S. MLB Network on Canadian providers instead.

Due to the structure of Rogers' MLB broadcast contracts, Sportsnet is not permitted to use its domestic production for Blue Jays games if the team is in postseason play (as it is technically still considered a regional broadcaster), and instead carries the U.S. broadcast (such as Fox in 2015, and TBS in 2016). This is in contrast to the NBA's Toronto Raptors (via TSN and Sportsnet), as well as the NHL and MLS's Canadian-based teams (via Hockey Night in Canada on CBC and Sportsnet, and TSN respectively) who were allowed to produce their own broadcasts during postseason games. Buck Martinez has served as a colour commentator for post-season coverage ultimately simulcast by Sportsnet, however, having formerly worked Division Series games for TBS, and on the MLB International broadcast of the 2016 World Series. In 2022, however, MLB allowed Sportsnet to carry its own production of Blue Jays postseason games.

Roster

Minor league affiliations

The Toronto Blue Jays farm system consists of seven minor league affiliates.

Season by season record

Awards and other achievements

Award winners and league leaders

Franchise records

No-hitters
Only one Blue Jays pitcher has thrown a no-hitter in franchise history. It was accomplished by Dave Stieb on September 2, 1990, after losing three no-hit bids with two outs in the ninth inning.

No perfect games, a special subcategory of no-hitter, have been thrown in Blue Jays history. The franchise came closest on August 4, 1989, when Stieb gave up a double to Yankees' batter Roberto Kelly with two outs in the ninth and he scored by the next batter.

Triple Crown champions
Roger Clemens won the pitching Triple Crown in 1997 and 1998.

Baseball Hall of Famers
Ten former Blue Jays, one former manager, and one former general manager, have been elected into the Baseball Hall of Fame. Second baseman Roberto Alomar, elected to the Hall of Fame in 2011, is the first player to be inducted based primarily on service as a player for the Blue Jays.

Bobby Doerr, a second baseman with the Boston Red Sox, served as a hitting coach with the Blue Jays early in their history, 1977–1981, and was the first person associated with the franchise to be elected to the Baseball Hall of Fame, in 1986.

Early Wynn, the Baseball Hall of Fame pitcher (1972) and career 300-game winner, was a radio broadcaster for the Blue Jays with Tom Cheek during their first few years, 1977–1981.

Ford C. Frick Award recipients

BBWAA Career Excellence Award recipients

Canadian Baseball Hall of Fame

Retired numbers

Soon after becoming the first person to be inducted in the Hall of Fame as a Blue Jay, on July 31, 2011, second baseman Roberto Alomar was the first person to have his number, #12, retired by the Blue Jays.

On March 29, 2018, the Blue Jays retired #32 in honour of Roy Halladay, who died in an airplane crash on November 7, 2017, becoming the second number to be retired by the Blue Jays.

Level of Excellence
In 1996, the Blue Jays instituted a "Level of Excellence" on the 500 level of the Rogers Centre, honouring "tremendous individual achievement."

*Roberto Alomar was inducted into the Level of Excellence in 2008, but was removed in 2021 after he was banned from baseball.

Players' uniform numbers were listed—and in Tom Cheek's case, the number of consecutive games he called for the Blue Jays—until the 2013 All-Star Break, even though, with the exception of Roberto Alomar and Roy Halladay these numbers have not been retired. During the 2013 All-Star Break, the Level of Excellence was redesigned for the addition of Carlos Delgado's name. The redesign removed all uniform numbers from the Level of Excellence aside from Roberto Alomar's retired #12, Roy Halladay's retired #32 and Tom Cheek's 4306 consecutive games called streak. On April 30, 2021, the Blue Jays announced that they would remove Alomar from the Level of Excellence and take down his banner at Rogers Centre after he was banned from baseball for sexual harassment.

On March 5, 2023, the Blue Jays announced that Jose Bautista would join the Level of Excellence on August 12, 2023, in a pre-game ceremony prior to their game that day versus the Chicago Cubs.

Charity and partnerships 
The Jays Care Foundation is the charitable arm of the Toronto Blue Jays baseball organization and conducts events to support local organizations and community members. They also provide baseball education and life skill workshops to the youth of communities across Canada.

Notes

References

Some text copied via the GFDL from BR Bullpen article on the 2009 Blue Jays

External links

 

 
Major League Baseball teams
Grapefruit League
Baseball teams established in 1977
1977 establishments in Ontario